Lee Hahn-koo (born 12 December 1945) is a South Korean politician and the former parliamentary leader of the Saenuri Party. A former economist, Lee was previously an economic adviser and chief of staff to Park Geun-hye, and in the 2012 parliamentary elections he campaigned on the slogan "Make Park Geun-hye the next president". He studied at Seoul National University and completed a doctoral degree in economics at Kansas State University before serving the South Korean Ministry of Finance as a civil servant. He is now serving his fourth term in the Assembly, having been elected as a proportional representation candidate in 2000 before becoming member for Suseong-gap in Daegu in 2004.

References

Living people
Liberty Korea Party politicians
Members of the National Assembly (South Korea)
Seoul National University alumni
Kansas State University alumni
1945 births
South Korean economists
South Korean Roman Catholics
Kyeongbuk High School alumni